Jean Bassan was a French writer and dramatists, winner of the prix des libraires in 1958.

Work 
 Novel
 1935: Le Centre du monde, éditions Gallimard
 1958: Le Mauvais Cheval, Plon 
 1958: Nul ne s'évade — Prix des libraires
 1959: Les Distractions — adapted to cinema in 1960 Trapped by Fear by Jacques Dupont
 1969: Les Nouveaux Patrons
 1972: La Possession, éditions Fayard

 Theatre
 1938: Juliette, three-act comedy, La Petite Illustration, n°900. Théâtre, n°450. 24 December

External links 
 Jean Bassan on Babelio
 Theatrical poster for Juliette, Théâtre de l'Œuvre (1938)

20th-century French male writers
20th-century French dramatists and playwrights
Prix des libraires winners